The Dodgers–Giants rivalry is a rivalry between the Los Angeles Dodgers and San Francisco Giants of Major League Baseball (MLB). It is regarded as one of the fiercest and longest-standing rivalries in American baseball, with some observers considering it the greatest sports rivalry of all time.

The rivalry between the Giants and Dodgers began in the late 19th century when both clubs were based in New York City. The Giants played at the Polo Grounds in the borough of Manhattan and the Dodgers played in the borough of Brooklyn.

After the  season, Dodgers owner Walter O'Malley decided to move the team to Los Angeles for financial and other reasons. Along the way, he convinced Giants owner Horace Stoneham (who was considering moving his team to Minnesota) to preserve the rivalry by bringing his team to California as well. New York baseball fans were stunned and heartbroken by the move, which left New York with only one baseball team, the Yankees. However, to supplant the absence of both the Dodgers and Giants, New York was granted a second baseball team, the Mets who began play in 1962, and inherited the colors of the rivalry — orange from the Giants and blue from the Dodgers.

Given that the cities of Los Angeles and San Francisco have long been competitors in the economic, cultural, and political arenas, the teams' new homes in California were fertile ground for the rivalry's transplantation. Each team's ability to endure for over a century while moving across the country, as well as the rivalry's growth from a cross-city to a cross-state engagement, have led to the rivalry being considered one of the greatest in sports history.

The Dodgers and Giants each have more National League pennants than any other team: the Dodgers have 24 and the Giants have 23. While the Dodgers have won the National League West 19 times compared to the Giants' 9 times since the beginning of the Divisional Era in 1969, the Giants have more total wins, head-to-head wins, and World Series titles (8–7) in franchise history. Since moving to California, the Dodgers hold the edge in pennants (12–6) and World Series titles (6–3). The Giants' most recent World Series appearance and championship occurred in 2014. The Dodgers last appeared in the World Series in 2020, winning in six games.

During their time on the East Coast, the Giants won the series 721–670–17 against the Dodgers. However, since the two teams moved to the West Coast, the Dodgers lead 592–552 as of the end of their 2022 regular season series. The two teams first met in the postseason in the 2021 National League Division Series, although they contested the 1889 World Series. They have played two tie-breaker series after ending the regular season tied for first place. Both series were best of 3 to decide the winner of the National League Pennant and both were won by the Giants 2–1 in 1951 and 1962. They are counted as part of the regular season.

Origins and early years

In the 1880s, New York City played host to a number of professional baseball clubs in the National League and the American Association. By 1889, each league had only one representative in New York—the Giants in the NL and Dodgers (then known as the Bridegrooms) in the AA. The teams met in the 1889 World Series, in which the Giants defeated the Bridegrooms 6 games to 3. In 1890, the Dodgers entered the NL and the rivalry was officially underway.

Although the two teams were geographically proximate rivals anyway, the animus between the two teams ran deeper than mere competitiveness. Giants fans were seen as well to do elitists of Manhattan while Dodgers fans tended to be more blue collar and had more Latino fans due to what was then the working class atmosphere of Brooklyn. In 1900, a year in which the Dodgers won the pennant and the Giants finished last, Giants owner Andrew Freedman attempted to have the NL split all profits equally, irrespective of the teams’ individual success or failure.

In the early 1900s, the rivalry was heightened by a long-standing personal feud (originally a business difference) between Charles Ebbets, owner of the Dodgers, and John McGraw, manager of the Giants. The two used their teams as fighting surrogates, which caused incidents between players both on and off the field, and inflamed local fans' passions sometimes to deadly levels.

In 1940, umpire George Magerkurth was brutally beaten during a game by an enraged Dodgers fan ostensibly for making a pro-Giants call. The rivalry is said to have been the motive for multiple fan-on-fan homicides, in 1938 and 2003.  Future Dodgers manager Joe Torre recalled how he felt threatened being a Giants fan growing up in Brooklyn in the series.

During the latter years for both teams in New York, players often engaged in purposeful, aggressive, physical altercations. In 1965, Giants pitcher Juan Marichal knocked Dodgers catcher John Roseboro in the head with a bat.

A long and balanced history

In , the Dodgers and Giants played their 2,500th game against each other, becoming only the third set of teams in the four major North American sports leagues to do so, joining the Pittsburgh Pirates and Chicago Cubs and the Pirates and St. Louis Cardinals.

One notable characteristic of the rivalry is how both have often played meaningful games late in the year. Since 1951, the Giants and Dodgers have finished first and second 11 times. Just as important is the role one team has played as spoiler to the other in the years when they were not directly competing in a pennant race.

The New York Giants won the 68-year series against the Brooklyn Dodgers, 721–670–17. But since relocating to the West Coast in 1958, the Dodgers are ahead in the games played between the two teams, 592–552.

On July 14, 2005, the Giants became the first professional sports team to win 10,000 games with a 4–3 win over the Dodgers.

Two Dodgers benefited from controversial calls against the Giants to keep streaks alive that continue to be Major League Records. In 1968, Don Drysdale set the current record for consecutive complete game shutouts (6) with a call against Dick Dietz for not attempting to avoid a bases loaded hit by pitch. In 1988, Orel Hershiser established the current record for consecutive scoreless innings pitched (59) with the benefit of an interference call against Brett Butler for breaking up a double play.

The Dodgers' 2014 and 2016 National League West championships were both won by overcoming leads by the Giants. Los Angeles overcame a  game lead by the Giants in 2014, and in 2016, despite the Dodgers missing star pitcher Clayton Kershaw for an extended amount of time, the Giants were unable to hold an eight-game lead over their rivals. In both seasons, though, the Giants won one of the Wild Card spots. During the 2010s, the Giants won three World Series titles, while the Dodgers had to wait until 2020 to win their first World Series since 1988.

Pennant races
The Dodgers held a -game lead over the Giants as late as August 11. Led by rookie Willie Mays, however, the Giants charged through August and September to catch and pass the Dodgers. The Dodgers won the final game of the season, tying the Giants for first place and necessitating a three-game tiebreaker for the pennant. The Giants won the first game, the Dodgers the second, with the Giants winning the third game with a dramatic ninth-inning home run by Bobby Thomson, a play known as the Shot Heard 'Round the World.
 In , the Giants led the Dodgers by three games as late as September 6. However, a late-year three-game sweep of the Giants both eliminated San Francisco from contention and allowed the Dodgers to catch the Milwaukee Braves, whom they defeated two games to zero in a three-game tiebreaker en route to winning the World Series. This started a string of pennant races between the two teams in the 1960s, in which the Giants and Dodgers finished no further than four games apart from each other and first place four times through . In 1965, the Giants went on a 14-game winning streak in early September to take a -game lead, but the Dodgers responded with a 13-game winning streak and won 15 of their final 16 games to beat out the Giants by two games. In 1966, a three-way race between the Dodgers, Giants, and Pittsburgh Pirates came down to the last day of the season. The Dodgers went into the second game of a doubleheader with the Philadelphia Phillies ahead of the Giants by one game. Had the Dodgers lost, the Giants would have been ½ game out and would have had to fly to Cincinnati to make up a game that had been rained out earlier in the season. If the Giants won that game, they would then have met the Dodgers in a playoff. But the Dodgers won the second game in Philadelphia to win the pennant by  games. In 1971, the Dodgers rallied from a -game September deficit to get within a game of the National League West-leading Giants with one game to play. But while the Dodgers were defeating the Houston Astros, the Giants beat the San Diego Padres to win the division.
In the ensuing three-game tiebreaker for the pennant, the Giants took two out of three, with the deciding blow being four runs by the Giants in the ninth inning (as the visiting team this time) to take the series and the pennant. This would prove to be the last best-of-three tiebreaker, as the National League switched to a single-game tiebreaker in 1969. As with 1951, that playoff win turned out to be the Giants' high-water mark of the season, as they lost the World Series to the New York Yankees on both occasions. 
After almost every reliever in the Giants bullpen had attempted to preserve a 3–0 lead going into the bottom of the ninth, several walks and an error set the stage for Steve Finley's dramatic grand slam off of Wayne Franklin, which clinched the division title for the Dodgers. Even with the wild card still up for grabs, this proved disastrous for the Giants – despite ace Jason Schmidt's fine performance in a 10–0 rout over the Dodgers the following day, an Astros win during the game eliminated the Giants from playoff contention. Had the Giants maintained their lead in the previous game and Schmidt performed similarly, the Giants would have forced a one-game tiebreaker against the Dodgers for the division crown. 
 In , Clayton Kershaw and the Dodgers shut down the Giants 5–1 late in the season, giving the Dodgers their second straight NL West crown. Kershaw and fellow Dodgers starter Zack Greinke went a combined 8–0 against the Giants. The Giants qualified for the playoffs two days later, earning the NL's second wild card. However, the Dodgers were eventually eliminated by the Cardinals in their NLDS, after which the Giants defeated the Cardinals in the NLCS and ultimately won the World Series over the Kansas City Royals.

Spoilers
When not tied for first during the last few days of the season, both teams have a long and storied history of eliminating their rival from playoff contention.
Prior to the  season, Giants manager Bill Terry was asked his opinion of various teams for the upcoming campaign, including the Dodgers. His response of "Are they still in the league?" was to prove provocative. While the Dodgers struggled, the Giants found themselves tied with the St. Louis Cardinals atop the National League with two games left to play, and facing the sixth-place Dodgers for a two-game series in Brooklyn. Despite winning 14 of 22 from the Dodgers that year, the Giants lost those last two to the "Flatbush spoilers" and the pennant to the Cardinals, who won their final two games.
 In , the Dodgers blew an eighth-inning lead at San Francisco in the last game of the second-to-last series of the year. This loss dropped the Dodgers three games behind the Houston Astros and cost them the chance to win the National League West division outright when they swept Houston in the final three games of the year. Instead, they were forced to play the Astros in a one-game tiebreaker – which they lost 7–1.
 In , the Dodgers and Giants were tied for second in the NL West, both one game behind the Atlanta Braves, as they faced each other in the final three games of the year. The Dodgers won the first two games 4–0 and 15–4 to eliminate the Giants, but then the Giants knocked the Dodgers out of the pennant race on the season's last day on a go-ahead three-run home run by Joe Morgan in the seventh inning, eventually winning the game 5–3. Thus, the Braves finished first by one game.
Trevor Wilson tossed a complete game shutout on the day in which the Dodgers were eliminated.
True to the balanced spirit of the rivalry, despite winning the first three games of that four-game series in Los Angeles, the Giants were unable to sweep the Dodgers at their home park in a four-game series for the first time since , and the Braves won the division by one game.
 In , a late September two-game sweep of the Dodgers at Candlestick Park highlighted by Barry Bonds' twirl after a home run in the first game and Brian Johnson's home run in the bottom of the 12th in the second tied the Giants with the Dodgers for first place and eventually propelled them into the playoffs. The impact on both organizations was significant; Fred Claire, who was then general manager of the Dodgers, said "those two days have stayed with me for the last 10 years", and Los Angeles Times sports columnist Bill Plaschke argued that "it led to an organizational upheaval...(from which) (i)t has taken the Dodgers nearly a decade to recover." In contrast, the Giants' run from 1997 through 2003 produced the most playoff appearances in that stretch for the franchise since the 1930s.
 The Dodgers have done their best to return the favor, however. In , the Giants finished two games behind the Arizona Diamondbacks as the Dodgers took two of the final three games of the year in San Francisco, despite Giants' outfielder Barry Bonds hitting an MLB record 73 home runs that season.
 In 2012, the Dodgers and Giants met in the final series of the regular season. The Giants had already clinched the NL West, but the Dodgers were in the wild card race. The Dodgers took 2 out of 3, but their 4–3 loss in game 2 of the series eliminated them from wild-card contention, giving the lower wild-card seed to St. Louis.

All of these events and their associated quirks and symbols are relished by the fans of these two teams.

Postseason meetings
In the 131-year history of the rivalry, the Giants and Dodgers had never faced each other in the postseason until the 2021 NLDS.
In the 2014 postseason, the Dodgers entered as NL West champions and the Giants a Wild Card team. The Giants defeated the Pittsburgh Pirates in the Wild Card Game and the Washington Nationals in the Division Series 3–1 to qualify for the National League Championship Series. The Dodgers on the other hand lost to the St. Louis Cardinals in the Division Series. Had the Dodgers won, they would have faced each other in the NLCS.
In 2016, the Dodgers came into the postseason as NL West champions, while the Giants again entered as a Wild Card team. The Dodgers defeated the Nationals in the Division Series to advance to the National League Championship Series. The Giants defeated the New York Mets in the Wild Card Game. However, the Giants lost to the Chicago Cubs in the Division Series, preventing a Dodgers-Giants matchup in the NLCS.
On the final day of the shortened 2020 regular season, the Giants, Philadelphia Phillies, and Milwaukee Brewers were fighting for the 8th and final seed in the expanded playoff tournament. For the Giants to clinch the 8th seed, they needed a win against the San Diego Padres and both a Brewers and Phillies loss, which would've set up a matchup against the Dodgers in the Wild Card Series. However, the Giants were eliminated from postseason contention when they were defeated by the Padres.
In 2021, the Giants clinched the National League West division over the Dodgers, which snapped a streak of 8 consecutive division championships for Los Angeles. The Giants also clinched the best record in the National League which meant they would have to face the winner of the 2021 NL Wild Card Game (between LA and the St. Louis Cardinals) in the NLDS. The Dodgers defeated the Cardinals off a Chris Taylor walk-off home run, and met the Giants for the first time ever in the postseason.
In the NLDS, the Dodgers and Giants played in their first postseason meeting in history. This series was evenly matched especially with both sides exchanging big moments towards each other. Logan Webb dominated the Dodgers through 7 2/3 innings as the Giants shut out the Dodgers in Game 1, 4–0. The Dodgers answered back with a 9–2 victory in Game 2, including a home run by Will Smith to even the series. The series shifted to Dodger Stadium in what would be a battle between Max Scherzer and Alex Wood, however the Giants would pull away with Game 3 thanks to a home run by Evan Longoria to give the Giants a 1–0 win. With the Dodgers facing elimination in Game 4, they sent out Walker Buehler on 3 days rest to start, the Dodgers would even up the series once more thanks to home runs by Mookie Betts and Will Smith (his second of the series) in a 7–2 victory. With both teams' seasons on the line, now headed back to San Francisco tied at 2 games apiece, the Giants sent out Logan Webb to try and clinch the series. Originally, the Dodgers had Julio Urias to be the starter, but instead started reliever Corey Knebel. The two teams remained scoreless until a Corey Seager RBI double broke the tie in the 6th to give them the lead. However, the Giants answered back on a solo home run by Darin Ruf off of Urias, but that would be all the Giants would score for the rest of the game. The game once again remain tied until the top of the 9th when Cody Bellinger drove in Justin Turner to give the Dodgers a 2–1 lead off of Camilo Doval. Max Scherzer came in to close out the bottom half of the 9th. Crawford was the first batter retired, but an error by Justin Turner on a batted ball from Kris Bryant would give the Giants life in the inning. Scherzer struck out LaMonte Wade and Wilmer Flores to give the Dodgers the series win and a trip to the NLCS against the Atlanta Braves. This was also the first career save for Max Scherzer in his professional career.

Pennants and championships
The Dodgers won the National League pennant 12 times in Brooklyn and 12 times in Los Angeles. The Giants won the National League pennant 17 times in New York and 6 times in San Francisco.

When the teams were based in New York, the Giants won five world championships, whereas the Dodgers won one. After the move to California, the Dodgers have won six, the Giants three. Prior to the 2020s, in both New York and in California, all of one team's world championships preceded the other's first one in that region to date. All but one of the Dodgers' world championships are sandwiched by the Giants' final world championship in New York and their first in San Francisco.

Since 2000, the Giants have advanced to the postseason eight times while the Dodgers have advanced thirteen times. In that time, the Giants appeared in four World Series, winning in 2010, 2012, 2014, and losing in 2002. The Dodgers made three World Series appearances after losing the Series in 2017 and 2018 and winning in 2020.

Season-by-season results

|-
| 1890
| style=";" | Bridegrooms
| style=";" | 10–8 
| Tie, 5–5 
| Bridegrooms, 5–3
| Dodgers (then known as the Brooklyn Bridegrooms) move to the National League, win 1890 NL pennant
|-
| 1891
| style=";" | Giants
| style=";" | 11–8 
| Giants, 7–3 
| Grooms, 5–4
| Bridegrooms change their name to "Grooms."
|-
| 1892
| Tie
| 7–7 
| Grooms, 4–3
| Giants, 4–3
| 
|-
| 1893
| Tie
| 6–6 
| Grooms, 5–1
| Giants, 5–1
| 
|-
| 1894
| style=";" | Giants
| style=";" | 7–5–1
| Giants, 4–2–1 
| Tie, 3–3
| 
|-
| 1895
| style=";" | Grooms
| style=";" | 9–3–1
| Grooms, 5–1–1
| Grooms, 4–2
| 
|-
| 1896
| style=";" | Giants
| style=";" | 8–4 
| Tie, 3–3
| Giants, 5–1
| On August 11, Giants take a 50–49–2 series lead, a lead the Giants have not relinquished to this day.
|-
| 1897
| style=";" | Giants
| style=";" |  
| Giants, 5–1–1
| Giants, 4–2–1
| Grooms change their name to "Bridegrooms"
|-
| 1898
| style=";" | Giants
| style=";" | 11–3 
| Giants, 4–3 
| Giants, 7–0 
| 
|-
| 1899
| style=";" | Superbas
| style=";" | 10–2
| Superbas, 5–2
| Superbas, 5–0
| Bridegrooms change their name to "Superbas," win 1899 NL pennant.
|-

|-
| 1900
| Tie
| 10–10 
| Superbas, 6–4 
| Giants, 6–4
| Superbas win 1900 NL pennant.
|-
| 1901
| style=";" | Superbas
| style=";" | 11–6 
| Superbas, 5–3 
| Superbas, 6–3
| 
|-
| 1902
| Tie
| 10–10 
| Giants, 6–4
| Superbas, 6–4
| 
|-
| 
| style=";" | Giants
| style=";" | 12–7–2 
| Giants, 7–3
| Giants, 5–4–2
| First year of organized Major League Baseball
|-
| 
| style=";" | Giants
| style=";" | 19–3 
| Giants, 9–2 
| Giants, 10–1
| Giants win 1904 NL Pennant, refuse to participate in No World Series.
|-
| 
| style=";" | Giants
| style=";" | 15–7 
| Giants, 8–3
| Giants, 7–4
| Giants win 1905 World Series
|-
| 
| style=";" | Giants
| style=";" | 13–9 
| Giants, 6–5
| Giants, 7–4
| 
|-
| 
| style=";" | Giants
| style=";" | 12–10–1 
| Tie, 6–6
| Giants, 6–4–1
| 
|-
|  
| style=";" | Giants
| style=";" | 16–6
| Giants, 9–2 
| Giants, 7–4 
| 
|-
| 
| style=";" | Giants
| style=";" | 15–7
| Giants, 7–4
| Giants, 8–3
| 
|-

|-
| 
| style=";" | Giants
| style=";" | 14–8 
| Tie, 6–6 
| Giants, 8–2
| 
|-
| 
| style=";" | Giants
| style=";" | 16–5–1 
| Giants, 9–2 
| 
| Giants lose 1911 World Series
|-
| 
| style=";" | Giants
| style=";" | 16–6
| Giants, 8–3
| Giants, 8–3
| Giants lose 1912 World Series
|-
| 
| style=";" | Giants
| style=";" | 14–8
| Giants, 8–3
| Giants, 6–5
| Giants lose 1913 World Series
|-
| 
| style=";" | Giants
| style=";" | 13–9
| Giants, 8–3 
| Robins, 6–5
| Superbas change name to "Robins"
|-
| 
| style=";" | Robins
| style=";" | 12–8 
| Robins, 7–4
| Giants, 5–4
| 
|-
| 
| style=";" | Robins
| style=";" | 15–7 
| Robins, 7–4
| Robins, 8–3
| Robins lose 1916 World Series
|-
| 
| style=";" | Giants
| style=";" | 
| Giants, 6–3–1
| Giants, 7–6–1
| Giants lose 1917 World Series
|-
|  
| style=";" | Giants
| style=";" | 12–8
| Robins, 5–4 
| Giants, 8–3 
| 
|-
| 
| style=";" | Giants
| style=";" | 12–8
| Giants, 7–3
| Tie, 5–5
| 
|-

|-
| 
| style=";" | Robins
| style=";" | 15–7 
| Robins, 8–3 
| Robins, 7–4
| Robins lose 1920 World Series
|-
| 
| style=";" | Robins
| style=";" | 12–10 
| Robins, 7–4 
| Giants, 6–5
| Giants win 1921 World Series
|-
| 
| style=";" | Giants
| style=";" | 14–8–1
| Giants, 8–4
| Giants, 6–4–1
| Giants win 1922 World Series
|-
| 
| Tie
| 11–11 
| Robins, 6–5
| Giants, 6–5
| Giants lose 1923 World Series
|-
| 
| style=";" | Giants
| style=";" | 14–8
| Giants, 6–5 
| Giants, 8–3
| Giants lose 1924 World Series
|-
| 
| style=";" | Giants
| style=";" | 12–10
| Robins, 6–5
| Giants, 7–4
| 
|-
| 
| style=";" | Giants
| style=";" | 13–9
| Robins, 6–5
| Giants, 8–3
| 
|-
| 
| style=";" | Giants
| style=";" | 
| Robins, 6–5–1
| Giants, 7–4
| 
|-
|  
| style=";" | Giants
| style=";" | 13–9–1
| Robins, 6–5–1
| Giants, 8–3
| 
|-
| 
| style=";" | Robins
| style=";" | 14–7 
| Robins, 8–3
| Robins, 6–4
| 
|-

|-
| 
| style=";" | Robins
| style=";" | 13–9  
| Robins, 6–5 
| Robins, 7–4
| 
|-
| 
| Tie
| 10–10 
| Robins, 6–3 
| Giants, 7–4
| 
|-
| 
| style=";" | Dodgers
| style=";" | 15–7  
| Giants, 6–5
| Dodgers, 10–1
| Robins change their name to "Dodgers"
|-
| 
| style=";" | Giants
| style=";" | 14–8–2
| Giants, 7–4–1
| Giants, 7–4–1
| Giants win 1933 World Series
|-
| 
| style=";" | Giants
| style=";" | 14–8
| Giants, 7–4
| Giants, 7–4
| 
|-
| 
| style=";" | Giants
| style=";" | 13–9
| Giants, 6–5
| Giants, 7–4
| 
|-
| 
| style=";" | Giants
| style=";" | 13–9
| Dodgers, 6–5
| Giants, 8–3
| Giants lose 1936 World Series
|-
| 
| style=";" | Giants
| style=";" | 16–6
| Giants, 8–3
| Giants, 8–3
| Giants lose 1937 World Series
|-
|  
| style=";" | Giants
| style=";" | 14–8
| Giants, 7–4 
| Giants, 7–4 
| Giants win 12 straight meetings (October 1937 – July 1938)
|-
| 
| style=";" | Dodgers
| style=";" | 12–10
| Dodgers, 7–4
| Giants, 6–5
| 
|-

|-
| 
| style=";" | Dodgers
| style=";" | 16–5 
| Dodgers, 7–3 
| Dodgers, 9–2
| 
|-
| 
| style=";" | Dodgers
| style=";" | 14–8 
| Dodgers, 6–5 
| Dodgers, 8–3 
| Dodgers lose 1941 World Series
|-
| 
| style=";" | Dodgers
| style=";" | 14–8–1 
| Dodgers, 9–2
| Giants, 6–5–1
| 
|-
| 
| style=";" | Dodgers
| style=";" | 14–8 
| Dodgers, 10–1
| Giants, 7–4
| 
|-
| 
| style=";" | Giants
| style=";" | 12–10
| Dodgers, 6–5 
| Giants, 7–4
| 
|-
| 
| style=";" | Dodgers
| style=";" | 15–7
| Dodgers, 9–2
| Dodgers, 6–5
| 
|-
| 
| style=";" | Dodgers
| style=";" | 15–7
| Dodgers, 10–1
| Giants, 6–5
| 
|-
| 
| style=";" | Dodgers
| style=";" | 14–8
| Dodgers, 9–2
| Giants, 6–5
| Dodgers 2B Jackie Robinson becomes the first African-American player in MLB history. Dodgers lose 1947 World Series
|-
|  
| Tie
| 
| Giants, 6–5–1
| Dodgers, 6–5 
| 
|-
| 
| style=";" | Dodgers
| style=";" | 14–8
| Dodgers, 8–3 
| Dodgers, 6–5 
| Dodgers lose 1949 World Series
|-

|-
| 
| style=";" | Dodgers
| style=";" | 
| Dodgers, 7–5 
| Tie, 5–5
| 
|-
| 
| style=";" | Dodgers
| style=";" | 
|  
| 
| Giants overcome a  game deficit to the Dodgers late in the season and tie the Dodgers after 154 games and force a three-game tiebreaker. Giants win the series 2–1 on Bobby Thomson's game-winning home run in the 9th inning of Game 3, known as the Shot Heard 'Round the World. Giants lose 1951 World Series.
|-
| 
| style=";" | Giants
| style=";" | 14–8
| Giants, 7–4
| Giants, 7–4
| Dodgers lose 1952 World Series
|-
| 
| style=";" | Dodgers
| style=";" | 15–7 
| Dodgers, 8–3
| 
| Dodgers lose 1953 World Series
|-
| 
| style=";" | Giants
| style=";" | 13–9
| Giants, 7–5 
| Giants, 6–4
| Giants win 1954 World Series
|-
| 
| style=";" | Dodgers
| style=";" | 13–9 
| Dodgers, 7–4
| Dodgers, 6–5
| Dodgers win 1955 World Series
|-
| 
| style=";" | Dodgers
| style=";" | 14–8 
| Dodgers, 7–4
| Dodgers, 7–4
| Dodgers lose 1956 World Series
|-
| 
| style=";" | Dodgers
| style=";" | 12–10 
| Dodgers, 6–5
| Dodgers, 6–5
| Dodgers and Giants final season in New York
|-
|  
| style=";" | Giants
| style=";" | 16–6
| Giants, 7–4 
| Giants, 9–2
| Dodgers and Giants relocate to Los Angeles and San Francisco, respectively
|-
| 
| style=";" | Dodgers
| style=";" | 14–8 
| Giants, 6–5
| Dodgers, 9–2
| Dodgers win 1959 World Series
|-

|-
| 
| style=";" | Giants
| style=";" | 
|  
| Giants, 7–4
| Giants move to Candlestick Park
|-
| 
| style=";" | Giants
| style=";" | 12–10
| Dodgers, 7–4 
| Giants, 8–3
| 
|-
| 
| style=";" | Giants
| style=";" | 11–10
| Dodgers, 7–4
| Giants, 7–3
| Dodgers open Dodger Stadium. NL expansion reduces schedule to 18 meetings per year. Giants and Dodgers tied atop the NL after 162 games, requiring a three-game tiebreaker. Giants win the series 2–1. Giants lose 1962 World Series.
|-
| 
| Tie
| 9–9 
| Dodgers, 6–3
| Giants, 6–3
| Dodgers win 1963 World Series
|-
| 
| style=";" | Giants
| style=";" | 12–6
| Giants, 5–4 
| Giants, 7–2
| 
|-
| 
| style=";" | Dodgers
| style=";" | 10–8 
| Dodgers, 5–4
|  
| Marichal–Roseboro incident. Dodgers win 1965 World Series
|-
| 
| Tie
| 9–9 
| Dodgers, 5–4
| Giants, 5–4 
| Dodgers lose 1966 World Series
|-
| 
| style=";" | Giants
| style=";" | 13–5
| Giants, 8–3
| Giants, 9–2
| 
|-
|  
| Tie
| 9–9 
| Giants, 5–4
| Dodgers, 5–4 
| 
|-
| 
| style=";" | Giants
| style=";" | 13–5
| Giants, 8–3
| Giants, 9–2
| 
|-

|-
| 
| Tie
| 9–9 
| Giants, 5–4 
| Dodgers, 5–4
| 
|-
| 
| style=";" | Dodgers
| style=";" |  
| Dodgers, 5–4 
| Dodgers, 7–2
| 
|-
| 
| Tie
| 9–9 
| Giants, 6–3
| Dodgers, 6–3
| 
|-
| 
| Tie
| 9–9 
| Giants, 5–4
| Dodgers, 5–4
| 
|-
| 
| style=";" | Dodgers
| style=";" |  
| Dodgers, 5–4 
| Dodgers, 7–2
| Dodgers lose 1974 World Series
|-
| 
| style=";" | Dodgers
| style=";" |  
| Dodgers, 6–3
| Giants, 5–4
| 
|-
| 
| style=";" | Giants
| style=";" |  
| Giants, 6–3
| Dodgers, 5–4
| 
|-
| 
| style=";" | Dodgers
| style=";" |  
| Dodgers, 6–3
| Dodgers, 8–1
| Dodgers win 13 straight meetings in San Francisco (August 1976 – September 1977). Dodgers lose 1977 World Series
|-
|  
| style=";" | Dodgers
| style=";" |  
| Dodgers, 6–3
| Dodgers, 5–4
| Dodgers lose 1978 World Series
|-
| 
| style=";" | Dodgers
| style=";" |  
| Dodgers, 8–1
| Dodgers, 6–3
| 
|-

|-
| 
| style=";" | Dodgers
| style=";" |  
| Dodgers, 7–2 
| Dodgers, 6–3
| 
|-
| 
| style=";" | Dodgers
| style=";" | 7–5 
| Tie, 3–3 
| Dodgers, 4–2
| Strike-shortened season results in only 12 meetings. Dodgers win 1981 World Series.
|-
| 
| Tie
| 9–9 
| Giants, 5–4
| Dodgers, 5–4
| 
|-
| 
| style=";" | Giants
| style=";" | 13–5 
| Giants, 6–3
| Giants, 7–2
| 
|-
| 
| style=";" | Dodgers
| style=";" | 10–8 
| Dodgers, 6–3 
| Giants, 5–4
| 
|-
| 
| style=";" | Dodgers
| style=";" | 11–7 
| Dodgers, 6–3
| Dodgers, 5–4
| 
|-
| 
| style=";" | Giants
| style=";" | 10–8 
| Dodgers, 5–4
| Giants, 6–3
| 
|-
| 
| style=";" | Dodgers
| style=";" | 10–8 
| Dodgers, 5–4
| Dodgers, 5–4
| 
|-
|  
| style=";" | Dodgers
| style=";" | 12–6 
| Dodgers, 6–3
| Dodgers, 6–3 
| Dodgers win 1988 World Series
|-
| 
| style=";" | Dodgers
| style=";" | 10–8
| Dodgers, 7–2
| Giants, 6–3
| Giants lose 1989 World Series
|-

|-
| 
| style=";" | Giants
| style=";" |  
| Giants, 5–4 
| Giants, 5–4
| 
|-
| 
| style=";" | Giants
| style=";" |  
| Dodgers, 5–4 
| Giants, 6–3 
| 
|-
| 
| style=";" | Giants
| style=";" |  
| Giants, 6–3
| Giants, 5–4
| 
|-
| 
| style=";" | Dodgers
| style=";" | 7–6 
| Dodgers, 4–3
| Tie, 3–3
| NL expansion reduces schedule to 12–13 meetings per season. Dodgers defeat the Giants 12–1 in game 162 in San Francisco to eliminate the Giants from winning the NL West.
|-
| 
| Tie
| 5–5
| Giants, 2–1 
| Dodgers, 4–3
| Strike-shortened season
|-
| 
| style=";" | Dodgers
| style=";" | 8–5 
| Dodgers, 5–1
| Giants, 4–3
| Strike-shortened season
|-
| 
| style=";" | Dodgers
| style=";" | 7–6 
| Dodgers, 4–3
| Tie, 3–3
| 
|-
| 
| Tie
| 6–6
| Dodgers, 4–2
| Giants, 4–2
| 
|-
|  
| Tie
| 6–6
| Dodgers, 4–2
| Giants, 4–2
| 
|-
| 
| style=";" | Dodgers
| style=";" | 8–5 
| Dodgers, 4–3
| Dodgers, 4–2
| Giants final season in Candlestick Park
|-

|-
| 
| style=";" | Dodgers
| style=";" | 7–5 
| Tie, 3–3 
| Dodgers, 4–2
| Giants open Pacific Bell Park (now known as Oracle Park).
|-
| 
| style=";" | Dodgers
| style=";" | 11–8 
|  
|  
| MLB changes to an "unbalanced schedule", resulting in 18–19 meetings per year. Giants' LF Barry Bonds sets the record for home runs in a season with 73.
|-
| 
| style=";" | Giants
| style=";" | 11–8 
| Giants, 7–3
| Dodgers, 5–4
| Giants lose 2002 World Series
|-
| 
| style=";" | Giants
| style=";" |   
| Giants, 5–4
| Giants, 8–2
| Dodgers' P Eric Gagne converts 55 of 55 save opportunities, tying the NL record for saves in a season. This was part of a string of 84 consecutive saves from 2002 to 2004.
|-
| 
| style=";" | Dodgers
| style=";" | 10–9 
| Dodgers, 5–4 
| Tie, 5–5
| 
|-
| 
| style=";" | Giants
| style=";" | 10–9 
| Dodgers, 5–4
| Giants, 6–4
| 
|-
| 
| style=";" | Dodgers
| style=";" | 13–6 
| Dodgers, 6–4
| Dodgers, 7–2
| 
|-
| 
| style=";" | Dodgers
| style=";" | 10–8 
| Giants, 6–3
| Dodgers, 7–2
| Dodgers win 11 straight games in San Francisco (August 2006 – July 2007). Giants LF Barry Bonds sets career home run record with 762.
|-
|  
| Tie
| 9–9
| Dodgers, 5–4 
| Giants, 5–4 
|
|-
| 
| style=";" | Dodgers
| style=";" | 11–7
| Dodgers, 6–3
| Giants, 5–4
| 
|-

|-
| 
| style=";" | Giants
| style=";" | 10–8 
| Giants, 5–4
| Giants, 5–4
| Giants win 2010 World Series
|-
| 
| Tie
| 9–9 
| Dodgers, 5–4
| Giants, 5–4
| 
|-
| 
| style=";" | Giants
| style=";" |  
| Giants, 5–4
| Giants, 5–4
| Giants win 2012 World Series
|-
| 
| style=";" | Giants
| style=";" | 11–8 
| Tie, 5–5
| Giants, 6–3
|   
|-
| 
| style=";" | Dodgers
| style=";" | 10–9
| Giants, 6–4
| Dodgers, 6–3
| First season in which both teams qualify for the postseason. Giants win 2014 World Series.
|-
| 
| style=";" | Giants
| style=";" | 11–8 
| Dodgers, 6–3
| Giants, 8–2
| 
|-
| 
| style=";" | Giants
| style=";" | 11–8 
| Dodgers, 6–3
| Giants, 8–2
| Second season in which both teams qualify for the postseason. Giants defeat the Dodgers in San Francisco in game 162 to clinch the final NL Wild Card spot.
|-
| 
| style=";" | Dodgers
| style=";" | 11–8
| Dodgers, 6–3 
| Tie, 5–5
| Dodgers lose 2017 World Series
|-
|  
| style=";" | Dodgers
| style=";" | 10–9
| Tie, 5–5 
| Dodgers, 5–4
| Dodgers lose 2018 World Series
|-
|  
| style=";" | Dodgers
| style=";" | 12–7
| Dodgers, 6–4 
| Dodgers, 6–3
| 
|-

|-
| 
| style=";" | Dodgers
| style=";" |  
| Dodgers, 4–3
| Dodgers, 2–1
| Season shortened to 60 games (with 10 meetings) due to COVID-19 pandemic. Mookie Betts signs with Dodgers. Penultimate game of season series in San Francisco was deliberately postponed due to players on both teams protesting the Shooting of Jacob Blake as part of the Black Lives Matter movement. The last two games were played as a seven-inning doubleheader, in which the Dodgers shut out the Giants in both games. Dodgers win 2020 World Series.
|-
| 
| style=";" | Giants
| style=";" | 
| Giants, 6–4
| Dodgers, 5–4
| Jimmie Sherfy became the first pitcher to ever appear in games for both the San Francisco Giants and Los Angeles Dodgers in the same season. No pitcher had appeared in games for both franchises since 1943 when Bill Sayles pitched for the New York Giants and Brooklyn Dodgers. Giants and Dodgers led MLB with 107 and 106 wins, respectively.
|- style="background:#f2f2f2; font-weight:bold;"
|  2021 NLDS
|  style=";" | Dodgers
|  style=";" | 3–2
|  Tie, 1–1
|  Dodgers, 2–1
|  First postseason meeting 
|-
| 
| style=";" | Dodgers
| style=";" | 
| Dodgers, 8–1
| Dodgers, 7–3
| Dodgers complete consecutive four-game sweeps at home and on the road (their first in San Francisco since 1977). The Dodgers finish the season 15–4 against the Giants, their most wins against them in a season since moving to Los Angeles in 1958. 
|-
| 
|
|
|
|
|
|-

|-
| Brooklyn Dodgers vs New York Giants
| style=";" | Giants 
| style=";" | 722–671–17
|  Dodgers, 364–336–8
|  Giants, 386–307–9
| 
|-
| Los Angeles Dodgers vs San Francisco Giants 
| style=";" | Dodgers 
| style=";" | 592–552
|  Dodgers, 316–258
|  Giants, 294–276
|
|-
| Overall Regular Season
| style=";" | Giants 
| style=";" | 1274–1263–17 
| Dodgers, 680–594–8
| Giants, 680–583–9
|
|-
| Postseason games 
| style=";" | Dodgers 
| style=";" | 3–2 
| Tie, 1–1
| Dodgers, 2–1
|
|-
| Postseason series  
| style=";" |Dodgers
| style=";" | 1–0
| 
|-
| Overall Regular Season and Postseason
| style=";" | Giants 
| style=";" | 1276–1266–17 
| Dodgers, 681–595–8
| Giants, 681–585–9
| 
|-

Fan reaction

Ardent fans of each club would be likely to consider the other as their "most hated" rival, enjoying the other team's misfortune almost as much as their own team's success. A typical Giants fan may just as soon ask "Did the Dodgers lose?" as they would "Did the Giants win?" and vice versa. This view is supported by the consistently solid attendance figures for Giants-Dodgers games at both home fields, and increased media coverage as well. The attendance for these 3 games represented almost  of their total fans (1.7 million) for the entire 81 game home schedule, and prompted at least one reporter on ESPN to wonder if the euphoria in the Bay Area following the games reflected a delusion that the Giants had won the World Series rather than simply knocking the Dodgers out. In 2009, Forbes rated the Giants-Dodgers rivalry the most intense rivalry in baseball due to its lasting competitiveness through the 20th century and both fanbases' willingness to be overcharged for Dodgers-Giants game tickets with a ticket markup of 44% for the 2008 season.

During games in Los Angeles, Dodgers fans will chant "Beat the Bay" when the Giants are in town and also used to chant "Barry Sucks", referring to former Giants outfielder Barry Bonds, often even when Bonds was not at bat or involved in a defensive play. In San Francisco, Giants fans will chant "Beat L.A." and the stadium used to have their screens read "Duck the Fodgers" when they were in town. A recent expression of these feelings was the 2007 All-Star Game in San Francisco, where the three Dodgers All-Stars (catcher Russell Martin and pitchers Brad Penny and Takashi Saito) were roundly booed by partisan fans throughout the festivities. During the final rounds of the 2013 World Baseball Classic, held at San Francisco's AT&T Park, Dodgers infielder Hanley Ramírez, competing for his home country, the Dominican Republic, was consistently booed at every appearance and whenever his name was mentioned on the public-address system.

Player reaction

The rivalry extends to players as well. According to legend and his teammate Tommy Lasorda, he did so because he had come to hate the Giants after ten years in Dodger Blue. This notion has been challenged on the grounds that Robinson would have been 38 years old when the new season began, and simply decided to retire. Nevertheless, in a gesture that transcends this heated rivalry, Robinson's retired blue Dodgers numeral '42' hangs in the Giants' home ballpark, Oracle Park, just as it does at all other MLB ballparks in remembrance of Robinson's breaking the color barrier in Major League Baseball. Like Robinson, Willie Mays refused to sign with the Dodgers after the  season, and was traded to the New York Mets, the National League successor to both the Giants and Dodgers in New York. Cy Young Award winners Tim Lincecum of the Giants and Clayton Kershaw of the Dodgers have helped keep the rivalry alive in recent years, as both have been the anchors of their respective teams' postseason rotations since 2010.

Both teams play in the National League West division, and due to the unbalanced schedule, play 19 head-to-head games each year. This is comparable to the 22 games each year that they faced each other in New York and Brooklyn.

In 2014, the rivalry intensified when Dodgers outfielder Yasiel Puig flipped his bat when hitting a home run off of Giants pitcher Madison Bumgarner. Since then, the two players had sparked some bench clearing incidents until Puig was traded to the Cincinnati Reds following the 2018 season. The Rivalry still exhibited notable moments following Puig’s trade to the Reds. On June 9, 2019, Dodgers’ infielder Max Muncy hit a home run off of Bumgarner into McCovey Cove. Muncy jokingly stared at the ball as it sailed over the outfield line, imitating Babe Ruth. As Muncy rounded the bases, Bumgarner seemed visually unimpressed and began trading insults with Muncy as he rounded the bases. Once returned to home plate, Muncy retorted “If you don’t like it, you can go get it out of the ocean!”.

Notorious incidents

Marichal–Roseboro incident
At Candlestick Park on August 22, Giants pitcher Juan Marichal was involved in a major altercation with Dodgers catcher John Roseboro. The Dodgers were involved in a tight pennant race late in the season, entering the game leading the Milwaukee Braves by  game and the Giants by  games.

Maury Wills led off the game with a bunt single off Marichal and, eventually scored a run when Ron Fairly hit a double. Marichal, a fierce competitor, viewed the bunt as a cheap way to get on base and took umbrage with Wills. When Wills came up to bat in the second inning, Marichal threw a pitch directly at Wills sending him sprawling to the ground. Willie Mays then led off the bottom of the second inning for the Giants and Dodgers' pitcher Sandy Koufax threw a pitch over Mays' head as a token form of retaliation. In the top of the third inning, Marichal threw a fastball that came close to hitting Fairly, prompting him to dive to the ground. Marichal's act angered the Dodgers sitting in the dugout and home plate umpire Shag Crawford then warned both teams that any further retaliations would not be tolerated.

Marichal came to bat in the third inning expecting Koufax to take further retaliation against him but instead, he was startled when Roseboro's return throw to Koufax after the second pitch either brushed his ear or came close enough for him to feel the breeze off the ball. When Marichal confronted Roseboro about the proximity of his throw, Roseboro came out of his crouch with his fists clenched. Marichal afterwards stated that he thought Roseboro was about to attack him and raised his bat, striking Roseboro at least twice over the head with his bat, opening a two-inch gash that sent blood flowing down the catcher's face that required 14 stitches. Koufax raced in from the mound to attempt to separate them and was joined by the umpires, players and coaches from both teams. A 14-minute brawl ensued on the field before Koufax, Mays, and others restored order. Marichal was ejected from the game and afterwards, National League president Warren Giles suspended him for eight games, fined him a then-NL record US$1,750 (equivalent to $ in ), and also forbade him from traveling to Dodger Stadium for the final, crucial two-game series of the season. Roseboro filed a $110,000 damage suit against Marichal one week after the incident but, eventually settled out of court for $7,500.

Marichal did not face the Dodgers again until spring training on April 3, . In his first at bat against Marichal since the incident, Roseboro hit a three-run home run. Giants General Manager Chub Feeney approached Dodgers General Manager Buzzy Bavasi to attempt to arrange a handshake between Marichal and Roseboro; however, Roseboro declined the offer. Years later, Roseboro stated that he was retaliating for Marichal having thrown at Wills. He explained that Koufax would not throw at batters for fear of hurting them due to the velocity of his pitches so, he decided to take matters into his own hands. He further stated that his throwing close to Marichal's ear was, "standard operating procedure", as a form of retribution.

Dodgers fans were angry at Marichal for several years after the violent incident, and reacted unfavorably when he was signed by the Dodgers in 1975. However, by this time Roseboro had forgiven Marichal, and personally appealed to the fans to calm down. After years of bitterness, Roseboro and Marichal became close friends in the 1980s, getting together occasionally at Old-Timers games, golf tournaments, and charity events. Roseboro also personally appealed to the Baseball Writers' Association of America not to hold the incident against Marichal after it passed him over for election to the Hall of Fame two years in a row. Marichal was elected in 1983, and thanked Roseboro in his induction speech. When Roseboro died in 2002, Marichal served as an honorary pallbearer and told the gathered, "Johnny's forgiving me was one of the best things that happened in my life. I wish I could have had John Roseboro as my catcher."

Reggie Smith incident
In the  season as a member of the Dodgers, Reggie Smith was taunted by Giants fan Michael Dooley, who then threw a batting helmet at him. Smith then jumped into the stands at Candlestick Park and started punching him. He was ejected from the game, and Dooley was arrested. Five months later, Smith joined the Giants as a free agent.

Fan violence
Giants fan Marc Antenorcruz was shot and killed by Dodgers fan Pete Marron on September 19, 2003, in the parking lot of Dodger Stadium, following a late-season Dodgers-Giants game. Marron was convicted of first degree murder and sentenced to 50 years in prison. A second defendant, Manuel Hernandez, pleaded no contest to voluntary manslaughter and had his 15-year sentence suspended.

There has also been Opening Day violence between the two teams' fans at Dodger Stadium. In 2009, Arthur Alverez, a reputed gang member, went to the Dodgers’ home opener with a couple and another man. After the game, Alverez and the other man, a Dodgers fan, began quarreling in the stadium parking lot. Alvarez stabbed the 30-year-old victim several times in the arm, back, and torso. He was arrested in May for suspicion of attempted murder. The trial by jury, held in August 2009, acquitted Alvarez on the charge of attempted murder.

Bryan Stow beating
On March 31, 2011, a 42-year-old Giants fan, Bryan Stow of Santa Cruz, California, was critically injured when he was beaten by two Dodgers fans in the Dodger Stadium parking lot after the Dodgers and Giants opened the 2011 season. The suspects subsequently fled the scene in a vehicle driven by a woman. Stow sustained severe injuries to his skull and brain and was placed into a medically induced coma after the incident. An early suspect, a 31-year-old man was arrested in his East Hollywood home in May 2011 in connection with the crime. The man was never formally charged and was declared innocent in July 2011 when Louie Sanchez and Marvin Norwood, of Rialto, were arrested and charged in the crime.  Lawyers for Stow say his medical care is expected to cost more than $50 million. On May 24, 2011, Stow's family filed a lawsuit against the Los Angeles Dodgers for $37.5 million for his lifetime care and compensation of lost earnings.

On September 27, 2011, relatives reported that Stow showed signs of improvement. Stow began an intensive therapy program in the Rehabilitation Trauma Center at Santa Clara Valley Medical Center on October 11. Doctors have told his family that he will never fully recover. On December 19, 2011, NBC aired the interview with Stow on the program Rock Center with Brian Williams. On October 25, 2012, he attended Game 2 of the 2012 World Series in San Francisco.

In April 2013, Stow's insurance company stopped paying for his full-time care in a residential rehabilitation facility and he moved into his parents' home in Capitola, California. Stow returned home on June 13, 2013, for the first time since the attack two years earlier.

On February 20, 2014, Sanchez and Norwood pleaded guilty. Under the plea bargain, Sanchez was sentenced to eight years in prison for felony mayhem and Norwood received four years for felony assault. On July 9, 2014, a jury found the Dodgers organization negligent in Stow's beating. The jury awarded $18 million in damages to Stow; the Dodgers are responsible for $13.9 million of this total. The remaining amount is to be split between Sanchez and Norwood.

On April 9, 2021, Stow threw the ceremonial first pitch for the Giants’ home opener against the Colorado Rockies.

Death of Jonathan Denver
On September 25, 2013, after a Dodgers-Giants night game in San Francisco, a man, in self-defense, stabbed a Dodgers fan to death six blocks from AT&T Park. The San Francisco medical examiner's office identified the deceased man as Jonathan Denver, 24, of Fort Bragg, California.

Two people were arrested in connection with Denver's death. San Francisco Police Chief Greg Suhr told the San Francisco Chronicle earlier that the victim of the attack was a Dodgers fan and was wearing Dodgers gear. Michael Montgomery, 21, of Lodi was arrested on suspicion of murder. Montgomery was later released, prosecutors citing insufficient evidence to charge him. His father claimed the stabbing was done in self-defense.

On March 12, 2014, San Francisco District Attorney George Gascón said that his office could not prove that Michael Montgomery did not act in self-defense when he stabbed Denver. According to Gascón, both Denver and his brother collectively weighed about 150 pounds more than Montgomery. According to witnesses, Montgomery had a bottle in his hand for self-defense while Denver was punching him. After Denver's brother grabbed an aluminum chair and hit Montgomery on the head with it, Montgomery dropped the bottle, took out a knife, and stabbed Denver. San Francisco prosecutors ultimately declined to file charges in connection with the case. Ironically, Gascon would proceed to become the Los Angeles District Attorney in 2020.

See also
Red Sox-Yankees rivalry
Chargers–Raiders rivalry
49ers–Rams rivalry
Kings–Sharks rivalry
California Clásico
Major League Baseball rivalries
1889 World Series

References
Inline citations

Bibliography

External links 
Dodgers-Giants: Baseball's Greatest Rivalry

Major League Baseball rivalries
Los Angeles Dodgers
San Francisco Giants